Gintaras Savukynas (born 18 February 1971) is a professional Lithuanian handball player, who played in center back position. Savukynas played in the World and European championships with the Lithuania National Handball team as the team captain. In 2005, he officially announced the end of his career as a player, to which he became an assistant coach for the Lithuania men's national handball team, before becoming the head of the national handball team for five years.

Biography 
Gintaras Savukynas started his career in Granitas Kauno  and played there for long period of time. During that time, they won the Lithuanian Handball League six times and Lithuania Handball Cup five times. In 1996, he was loaned out to GKS Wybrzeze Gdansk, a team in the  Polish Superliga (the top men's handball league in Poland). During the same year, he also moved to Norway to play for HC Kristiansand IF.

After the successful season in Norway and during the 1997 World Handball Championship in Japan, Savukynas underwent a knee surgery and finished the recovery season with Kauno Granitas, once again winning the Lithuania Handball League. Savukynas was named MVP of the Lithuania Handball League in 1994 and 1998. 

After the 1998 season and a successful 1998 European Handball Championship in Italy, Savukynas transferred to UMFA Afturelding in Iceland. While playing for UMFA Afturelding in 1999, he won every possible title in Iceland – Champions Cup, Iceland Handball Cup, Iceland Handball League (for the first and only time in the club history) . In 2000, Savukynas was named as the best offensive player of Iceland Handball league. In 2001, Savukynas moved to play in Switzerland for the top division team TV Zofingen. During that period, Savukynas was one of the top scorers in the league.

In 2002, Savukynas went back to play in Lithuania for Vilnius Šviesa where he helped the club win its first ever bronze medal in history. Savukynas was also selected as the MVP of the Lithuania Handball league for a third time. After this season, he moved to play in Iceland once again for HC Grotta/KR, where he played until the end of his career.

Coach career 
Savukynas became the head coach of HC Viking Malt club in Panevėžys after ending his career as a player. The team won the Lithuania Handball Cup for the first time in the club's history. In the second season, they won the Lithuania Handball Cup back to back but lost 2–3 in the Lithuania Handball League final to Kauno Granitas. In the 3rd season (2006), Savukynas won the Lithuania Handball League for the first time as a head coach. They beat Kauno Granitas to end their 16-year dominance in the league. Savukynas was selected as the head coach of the year after winning the title.

In 2006, he went to coach ÍB Vestmannaeyja, who were playing in the second Iceland division. During the first season, Savukynas managed to promote the team back to the top division and was selected as the best head coach in the second division.

In 2009, he became the head coach of the Lithuania men's national handball team. During the qualifying rounds, the team showed strong character and for 3 times, they were one step away from the World Championship.

In 2010, Savukynas was announced as the head coach of newly emerging super club in Belarus HC Meshkov Brest. In the first season, the club won Belarus handball cup and finished second in the Belarus handball league. During the second season Savukynas managed to guide the team to the EHF Cup quarterfinals, finishing second in the Belarus Handball League and played in the Belarus Cup final.

In 2013, he started working in Norway at Bergsøy IL, where he coordinated all the handball functions and also coached the club's men team. After just one season, Savukynas was promoted to the general manager of handball.
  
In 2016, he moved to Finland HC Riihimaen Cocks where he stayed for 3 and a half seasons. In the first season, Cocks managed to qualify for the EHF Cup group stage for the first time in the club's history, as well as winning the Baltic Handball League, Finnish Handball League and Finland Handball Cup. In the second season, Savukynas repeated the success of the first season, qualifying the team for the EHF Cup group stage and winning for the 2nd time Baltic Handball League, Finnish Handball League and Finland Handball Cup. In the 3rd season, Riihimaen Cocks debuted in the EHF Champions League and repeated the treble for the 3rd time - Baltic Handball League, Finnish Handball League and Finland Handball Cup. Savukynas was selected as the best coach in Finland twice (2017, 2019). During the 4th season, Savukynas' team played in the EHF Champions league once again.

In 2020 february, he transferred to HC Motor Zaporozhye in Ukraine. The club will play in the EHF Champions League group stage in the 2020/2021 season. Gintaras Savukynas won

Honours

As a player
 Lithuanian Handball League champion: 1991, 1992, 1993, 1994, 1995, 1996, 1998
 Lithuania handball cup winner: 1991, 1992, 1993, 1994, 1996
 Best Lithuanian Handball League player: 1994, 1998, 2003
 Iceland Handball League champion:  1999
 Iceland handball cup winner: 1999
 Iceland champions cup winner: 1999
 Best offensive player in Iceland Handball League: 2000
 1997 World Handball Championship Japan 10th place with Lithuania National handball team
 1998 European Handball Championship Italy 9th place with Lithuania National handball team

As a coach
 Lithuanian Handball League champion: 2006
 Lithuania handball cup winner: 2004, 2005
 Best coach of Lithuanian Handball League: 2006
 Promotion to Iceland top division: 2007
 Best coach of Iceland 2nd division: 2007
 Belarus Handball Cup winner: 2011
 Quarter final in EHF Cup: 2012
 Baltic handball league champion: 2017, 2018, 2019
 Finnish Handball League champion: 2017, 2018, 2019
 Finland handball cup winner: 2017, 2018, 2019
 EHF Cup group stage: 2016–2017, 2017–2018
 EHF Champions League group stage: 2018–2019, 2019–2020, 2020–2021, 2021–2022
 Best coach of Finnish Handball League: 2017, 2019
 Ukraine Handball league: 2020, 2021
 Ukraine Handball Cup: 2021
 SEHA League: 3rd place (2020-2021)

References

External links 
 leballonrond.fr
 linkedin.com

Lithuanian male handball players
1971 births
Living people